Plamen Dimov (born 29 October 1990) is a Bulgarian football defender who plays for Bulgarian first League club Spartak Varna. His twin brother Galin Dimov is also a footballer. They are sons of the distinguished Bulgarian footballer Diyan Petkov.

Career
Dimov made his A PFG debut for Chernomorets Burgas on 10 March 2012 in a game against Lokomotiv Plovdiv.

On 9 January 2013, Dimov signed with Levski Sofia. He was released from the team in late January 2015. Later that month he put pen to paper on a two-year contract with Kazakhstan Premier League club Kaisar. Quickly establishing himself as a starter, Dimov's season was cut short after making just two league appearances due to sustaining an anterior cruciate ligament injury during a training session.

Botev Plovdiv

In February 2017, Dimov signed with Botev Plovdiv but was unable to play until the 2017–18 season due to problems with the registration.

On 29 June 2017 Plamen Dimov finally made an official debut for Botev Plovdiv during the 3–1 away win over Partizani Tirana in the 1st qualifying round of UEFA Europa League. On 20 July Dimov scored his first goal for Botev Plovdiv during the 4–0 win over Beitar Jerusalem in the 2nd qualifying round of UEFA Europa League.

Dimov left the club at the end of the 2017–18 season.

Cherno More
In June 2018, Dimov signed with Cherno More.  On 30 July, he made his official debut in a 2–2 away draw against Levski Sofia.

Spartak Varna
In August 2022, Dimov joined  Spartak Varna.

Honours
Botev Plovdiv
Bulgarian Supercup: 2017

References

External links 
 Profile at LevskiSofia.info
 
 
 Player Profile at Sportal.bg

1990 births
Living people
Sportspeople from Burgas
Bulgarian twins
Twin sportspeople
Bulgarian footballers
Bulgaria under-21 international footballers
FC Pomorie players
PFC Chernomorets Burgas players
PFC Levski Sofia players
FC Kaisar players
FC Shakhter Karagandy players
FC Altai Semey players
Botev Plovdiv players
PFC Cherno More Varna players
PFC Spartak Varna players
FC Okzhetpes players
First Professional Football League (Bulgaria) players
Second Professional Football League (Bulgaria) players
Kazakhstan Premier League players
Bulgarian expatriate footballers
Bulgarian expatriate sportspeople in Kazakhstan
Expatriate footballers in Kazakhstan
Association football central defenders